Rhabdocaulon  is a genus of plants in the family Lamiaceae, first described as a genus in 1936. It is native to South America.

Species
 Rhabdocaulon coccineum (Benth.) Epling - southern Brazil
 Rhabdocaulon denudatum (Benth.) Epling - Brazil
 Rhabdocaulon erythrostachys Epling - southern Brazil
 Rhabdocaulon gracile (Benth.) Epling - southern Brazil
 Rhabdocaulon lavanduloides (Benth.) Epling - southern Brazil
 Rhabdocaulon stenodontum (Briq.) Epling - southern Brazil, Paraguay, northeastern Argentina
 Rhabdocaulon strictum (Benth.) Epling - southern Brazil, Uruguay, northeastern Argentina

References

Lamiaceae
Lamiaceae genera